Deewana is a 1992 Indian Hindi-language romantic action film directed by Raj Kanwar and written by Sagar Sarhadi. It stars Divya Bharti, Rishi Kapoor and Shah Rukh Khan (in his film debut). The film revolves around an effervescent girl Kaajal (Bharti), depicting her travails as a widow after the disappearance of her husband Ravi (Kapoor) and how her obsessive lover Raja (Khan) wins her over. Sushma Seth, Alok Nath and Amrish Puri play supporting roles.

The story for Deewana was written by Ranbir Pushp. Guddu Dhanoa, Lalit Kapoor and Raju Kothari had co-produced the film under the banner, Mayank Arts. The cinematography was handled by Harmeet Singh while A. Muthu edited it. The duo Nadeem-Shravan composed the award-winning soundtrack for the film with lyrics penned by Sameer. The muhurat shot for the film took place on 14 July 1991.

The soundtrack album turned out to be a chartbuster and was the highest-selling soundtrack of the year. The success of the film consolidated both Khan and Bharti's foothold in the industry, and launched Kanwar's directorial career. At the 38th Filmfare Awards, it received 9 nominations, and won 5 awards including Best Male Debut (Khan) and Best Female Debut (Bharti).

Plot
Kajal, a beautiful young lady, falls in love with Ravi, a rich and handsome man. They happily marry with the full blessings of Ravi's mother, Lakshmi Devi. Ravi's greedy uncle Dhirendra and cousin Narendra are disappointed to hear of this, because they are next in line to inherit the family's vast wealth after Ravi. Dhirendra hires hoodlums to murder Ravi. The hoodlums, along with Narendra, try to murder Ravi. What happens in the struggle is that Ravi manages to kill his cousin Narendra and both of them topple over a cliff in the general confusion. The hoodlums flee. The news reaches Ravi's family. Widowed and depressed, Kajal moves to another city along with Ravi's mother Lakshmi Devi.

Raja, a handsome, rich, jobless and good-hearted guy riding a motorcycle, accidentally knocks down Lakshmi Devi on the street, takes her to her home, and thus meets Kajal. He falls in love with Kajal, and tries to express it, but she cuts him short and reveals that she is already married and a widow. Taken aback briefly, Raja returns with his suit, but Kajal continues to resist his advances. Raja's rich father, Ramakant, dislikes the idea of his son marrying a widow and tries to get rid of Kajal. After this, Raja quarrels with his father and begs Lakshmi Devi for marriage with her widowed daughter-in-law. Lakshmi Devi persuades Kajal to marry Raja, saying that Kajal has a long life ahead of her, she has no child, and will be totally alone after Lakshmi Devi's death. Kajal finally accepts second marriage at her mother-in-law's behest. Lakshmi Devi conveys the acceptance to Raja, but she also tells him how reluctant Kajal was, and advises him that even after the wedding, he should go slow and not approach Kajal in a sexual way until she genuinely, in a heartfelt way, accepts him as her husband.

News of Raja's forthcoming engagement is the last straw for his father, who throws him out without further ado. Raja now has to look for a job. His friends open a garage with him. He meets with an accident and is hospitalised. Kajal rushes to see and realises that she is in fact in love for him. They begin a new phase, with reciprocal affection for each other.

Raja, who is obviously very accident-prone, meets with yet another fortuitous accident. The man at the other end of the accident becomes a great friend of Raja. Little does Raja know that this man is none other than Kajal's wedded husband, Lakshmi Devi's much-mourned son.

When Raja introduces Ravi to Kajal, she is shocked by learning that Ravi survived Dhirendra's attempt to murder him. However, she stays with Raja. Dhirendra learns about Ravi. He kidnaps Kajal and Raja, demanding Ravi's property in exchange. Raja escapes and beats Dhirendra along with Ravi. They find Kajal tied up with a bomb strapped around her. Ravi manages to switch off it. Dhirendra returns only to kill Raja. Ravi pushes him and sets the bomb off, causing a large explosion that kills the two for all. Kajal and Raja honour Ravi's sacrifice.

Cast
Rishi Kapoor as Ravi
Divya Bharti as Kajal
Shahrukh Khan as Raja Sahay 
Amrish Puri as Dhirendra Pratap Singh, Narendra’s father.
Dalip Tahil as Ramakant Sahay, Raja's father.
Mohnish Behl as Narendra Pratap Singh, Dhirendra’s son. (special appearance)
Sushma Seth as Laxmi Devi, Ravi’s mother.
Deven Verma as Devdas Sabrangi, Kajal’s maternal uncle.
Asha Sachdev as Chandramukhi , Kajal’s maternal aunt.
Alok Nath as Mr. Sharma 
Ankush Mohite
Brahmachari as Chintamani

Production
In the early 1990s, Ranbir Pushp conceived the story of Deewana, and Guddu Dhanoa being pleased with it, decided to bankroll the film under his own production banner, Mayank Arts. In an interview to Rediff.com, Raj Kanwar, who had previously worked as an assistant director to Shekhar Kapur in films such as Mr. India (1987) and Ghayal (1990), revealed that he was approached by Dhanoa to direct Deewana, becoming his directorial debut. Lalit Kapoor and Raju Kothari co–produced the film along with Dhanoa.

Rishi Kapoor was the first person to be signed, he being Kanwar's first choice. For the female lead, Madhuri Dixit had been Kanwar's initial choice. Her unavailability and lack of dates led to the casting of Divya Bharti, on the recommendation of Guddu Dhanoa's friend and the former's manager, Jatin Rajguru. Dhanoa addressed Bharti to be "time-punctual" and that once she refused to get off her car as she had come a bit late for the shoot.

Kanwar had several actors in mind for the role of Raja. Some of them included Armaan Kohli, Sunny Deol, Anil Kapoor, Govinda and Telugu actor Nagarjuna. Kohli had shot for it a few days, but later opted out citing a misunderstanding between him and Shabnam Kapoor (wife of Lalit Kapoor, one of the producers of the film) on the sets of Insaaf Ki Devi (1992). Shah Rukh Khan, then a budding artist, was finally selected. Kanwar had liked his performance in Circus and Dil Dariya and thus suggested his name to the producers. He worked in the film alongside his prior commitments to Raju Ban Gaya Gentleman (1992), his other film which was supposed to mark his debut. He expressed his enjoyment on hearing that [Rishi Kapoor] was also a part of the film.

Principal photography took place in and around Mumbai and Ooty, being handled by Harmeet Singh. B. H. Tarun Kumar was the choreographer while Ram Shetty and Harish Shetty were the action directors. Leena Daru acted as the costume designer. Songs were shot at various locations in Ooty, such as the Botanical Gardens and Ooty Lake. After filming ended by early 1992, it was edited by A. Muthu.

Music

The soundtrack album features 7 songs composed by Nadeem-Shravan, a duo. Sameer wrote the lyrics and Kumar Sanu (singing for Kapoor), Sadhana Sargam, Alka Yagnik (both singing for Bharti), and Vinod Rathod (singing for Khan) performed the vocals. The album sold between 7million and 8million units, making it the best-selling Bollywood soundtrack album of 1992.

The soundtrack album is featured by Planet Bollywood in their listing of "100 Greatest Bollywood Soundtracks". News18 included "Aisi Deewangi" as one of the "5 Memorable Songs of Divya Bharti" and raved about her presence in it by saying that it made "people swoon over her as well the tune. Her effortless beauty, along with her charming on-screen chemistry with Shahrukh Khan multiplied the X-Factors and made it a delightful watch." Rediff listed it among the "10 Amazing Nadeem-Shravan songs".

Release
The film was released on 25 June 1992. It was promoted with the tagline The Power of Love. When director Raj Kanwar had gone to attend the first screening of the film, along with the distributers, he was shocked to find the theatre deserted. But later, they found it swarming with mostly college kids, ensuring that the film became a blockbuster. It ran at theatres for 50 weeks and emerged a golden jubilee film. According to the film-trade website Box Office India, it collected  worldwide and became the second-highest-grossing film of the year, surpassed only by Beta. It was made available for streaming on Amazon Prime Video since 2020.

Accolades

Reception 
Deewana received positive reviews from critics upon release, with major praise directed towards its [cinematography], soundtrack and the cast performances, particularly that of Bharti and Khan. Nikhat Kazmi published a review of the film in The Times of India on 28 June 1992, writing that Khan's role is clichéd but he was able to "interpret it with a fresh zeal and wafts across like a breeze in the traditional role of a young man obsessed with love. Angry, confused, tender, mature and childishly rebellious, Deewana marks the advent of a new talent". On 31 July, a writer in The Indian Express praised the film's cinematography and songs, but was critical to its story which he called "no more than a routine melodrama". The writer added that Bharti had a "pretty ... but ... thin" role and "there is nothing she can do about it". He further observed that Khan is "fairly impressive and brings some life to a conventional role". In an interview, while reviewing the film by himself, Khan said that his performance in the film was "awful–loud, vulgar and uncontrolled" and that he "overacted terribly" in it. According to him, he hasn't contributed anyway to the film's success, and credited Nadeem–Shravan's music for the same, while also praising the performances of Kapoor and Bharti.

Modern film reviewers, however, appreciated Deewana. In 2007, the author Anupama Chopra described the film as a "crude and melodramatic" work, with Khan's performance being "equally loud". She said that the film established his position as a leading actor of Hindi cinema, despite his "over-the-top" performance. Rachit Gupta of Filmfare in 2014 stated, "Divya seemed at ease sharing screen space with Rishi Kapoor. She also matched [Shah Rukh Khan]'s manic intensity emotion to emotion. She fit perfectly into the character of a woman dealing with the loss of her husband." In 2018, Sampada Sharma from The Indian Express wrote that her performance is unforgettable, adding, "From playing a newly married girl to being the one who is at a crossroads in her life, Deewana was Divya's film and she delivered a performance that was applause-worthy."

Theme
Deewana deals with the central theme of love. [Raj Kanwar] had compared the role of [Divya Bharti] to that of female roles in his other films like Laadla (1994), Jaan (1996), Jeet (1996) and Judaai (1997) stating that they all were "strong female characters", portraying either the plight of women or displaying the acting prowess of the respective actresses. The film also shows how individuals become "obsessed" while in love, through the character of [Khan]. He himself talked about this as a lesson he learnt from the film while at University of Edinburgh to receive an honorary degree. Several critics compared [Rishi Kapoor]'s role to that in Chandni (1989) for in both the films, he was portrayed as the sacrificing husband. In another aspect, [Deewana] emerged as the pathbreaking Bollywood love triangle with its storyline portraying the first lover to be sacrificer, a reversal to the general rule.

Legacy
Deewana has been regarded as one of the earliest Indian films based on the social stigma of widow remarriage. The film's music, being composed by the duo [Nadeem-Shravan], became a multi-platinum success. [Divya Bharti]'s performance fetched her critical appreciation;  the film's title became synonymous with her. The film is also notable for being the debut film of [Shah Rukh Khan]. Despite having limited screen presence in the second half of the film, his portrayal of an obsessive lover achieved him a major career breakthrough. The song "Koi Na Koi Chahiye" picturised on him has gradually gathered a cult following. Ashok Raj described his role as "A small-town commoner who stalks a rich widow to gain access to a prosperous lifestyle." News18 remarks that Kapoor's "filmography came to a head" with Deewana and that it remains it to be one of his most memorable works, his fashion in the film being considered a trendsetter for himself.

Additionally, Deewana has been included in many listings—"500 Greatest Bollywood Movies of the 80s, 90s and 2000s", "Top 90 Hindi Movies Of The 1990s" and "100 Greatest Bollywood Love Triangle Movies". The soundtrack album was featured by Planet Bollywood among the "100 Greatest Bollywood Soundtracks" with a conclusion that "Deewana was simply one of the best albums of the 90s". India Today ranked Deewana first as one of the "Top Films of Raj Kanwar". Filmfare featured it in their listing of "16 Best Shah Rukh Khan Movies". Rediff.com has placed the film twice in its listing of "Top 20 soundtracks of Nadeem–Shravan" and "10 Amazing Nadeem–Shravan songs". The scene where Khan confronts Bharti and throws red colour on her white saree to confess his love to her was included by NDTV as one of the "Top 10 Holi scenes from Bollywood". Diptakirti Chaudhuri, a film critic, hailed Deewana to be a pathbreaking film in Bollywood, as it showed a complete contrast to the general storyline of love triangles.

The film has been referenced many times in the following years. In Pehla Nasha (1993), Khan says to Deepak Tijori, "You have done a miracle (Chamatkar) gentleman, I have become a crazy fan ([Deewana]) of you." Moreover, in the "Chennai Express Special - Part 2" episode of the popular television sitcom Taarak Mehta Ka Ooltah Chashmah, Popatlal dances along the song "Koi Na Koi Chahiye". The film's poster is shown in the film Dhanak. A footage from Deewana is also shown in Fan.

Sequel
A sequel to Deewana was announced in 2013 by the producer Guddu Dhanoa.

Notes

References

Bibliography

External links
 
 Deewana Full Movie At Filmywrep

1990s Hindi-language films
1992 films
Films scored by Nadeem–Shravan
Films scored by Surinder Sodhi
Films set in Mumbai
Films shot in Mumbai
Hindi films remade in other languages
Indian romantic drama films